The Bonito River is a river of Rio de Janeiro state in southeastern Brazil. It is a tributary of the Caceribu River.

See also
List of rivers of Rio de Janeiro

References
OpenStreetMap

Rivers of Rio de Janeiro (state)